John Hart Lake is a reservoir on Vancouver Island in British Columbia, Canada. The lake was created in 1947 when the John Hart Dam impounded the Campbell River, and is the water source for the city of Campbell River. The Campbell River flows from the lake at the John Hart Dam and via the John Hart generating station. The lake is named for John Hart, a Canadian politician who was the 23rd Premier of British Columbia.

References 

Lakes of Vancouver Island
Lakes of British Columbia
Sayward Land District